La Poma is a village and rural municipality in Salta Province in northwestern Argentina.

See also
Cave Puente del diablo

References

Populated places in Salta Province